Antonio Pedro Osuna (born April 12, 1973) is a Mexican former professional baseball pitcher, who played for the Los Angeles Dodgers, Chicago White Sox, New York Yankees, San Diego Padres, and Washington Nationals during his 11-year Major League Baseball (MLB) career.

Going into 1995, he had been the Dodgers #2 prospect and #15 overall as rated by Baseball America. Osuna posted earned run averages of 3.00, 2.19, and 3.06 over the next three seasons. On March 17, he was traded to the Chicago White Sox with minor leaguer Carlos Ortega for Gary Majewski and minor leaguers Andre Simpson and Orlando Rodriguez. Osuna Spent time on the disabled list in 2001 and played only 4 games for the White Sox. In the  season, Osuna appeared in 59 games with a 3.86 ERA. On January 15, he was traded to the New York Yankees with minor leaguer Delvis Lantigua for Orlando Hernández.

Osuna became a free agent after the 2003 season and signed with the San Diego Padres. A free agent again after the  season, Osuna signed with the Washington Nationals. He pitched only 2 1/3 innings with the Nats giving up 11 earned runs before he was placed on the disabled list on April 18. He was released after the season.

In , Osuna pitched in the Triple-A Mexican League for the Tigres de Quintana Roo recording a 1.61 ERA in 22 games and being named to the midseason All-Star team.

Osuna's pitch repertoire (by 1997) included a four-seam fastball, a curveball, and a changeup.

He and his wife Arcelia have 3 children: Lohami, Lenix and Yorvit.

On August 30, 2011, his nephew Roberto Osuna was signed by the Toronto Blue Jays. Osuna was only 16 years old at the time of signing. He had been ranked fourth by Baseball America in projected signing bonus rankings.

References

External links

1973 births
2006 World Baseball Classic players
Albuquerque Dukes players
Bakersfield Dodgers players
Baseball players from Sinaloa
Chicago White Sox players
Gulf Coast Dodgers players
Gulf Coast Yankees players
Lake Elsinore Storm players
Living people
Los Angeles Dodgers players
Major League Baseball players from Mexico
Major League Baseball pitchers
Mexican expatriate baseball players in the United States
New Orleans Zephyrs players
New York Yankees players
San Antonio Missions players
San Bernardino Spirit players
San Bernardino Stampede players
San Diego Padres players
Tampa Yankees players
Washington Nationals players
Yakima Bears players